Dart Container Corporation of Mason, Michigan, United States, is the world's largest manufacturer of foam cups and containers, producing about as many as all competitors combined. Dart Container is privately held by the Dart family.

In May 2012, Dart acquired Illinois-based Solo Cup Company and now has approximately 15,000 employees and more than 45 production, distribution center, and office locations in eight countries.

Company history
Dart Manufacturing Company was founded in 1937 by William F. Dart as a machine shop, manufacturing key rings, steel tape measures, and dog tags for the Department of Defense. When his son, William A. Dart, came out of the University of Michigan with three degrees (metallurgy, mathematics, and engineering), he worked for DuPont briefly, then joined the family business in the late 1950s. He experimented with and perfected an expandable polystyrene (EPS) molding process, and shipped their first insulated foam cups in April 1960. Dart Container Corporation was incorporated in 1960. On September 17, 2019, Dart had partnered with Keep America Beautiful.

Operations
Dart Container Corporation is vertically integrated, which, according to the company, makes it "virtually self-sufficient".

In 2006, Family Business ranked Dart Container 37th in its listing of family companies, with an estimated $1.1 billion in sales, and 4,950 employees.

Solo Cup Company
Dart Container purchased Solo Cup Company in May 2012 in a deal valued at approximately $1 billion.  The iconic Solo red cup was slated to remain under the Solo name.

IRS controversy 
The company is owned by brothers Kenneth B. Dart and Robert C. Dart, who renounced their U.S. citizenship in 1994. Kenneth Dart then established a relationship with the nation of Belize, which promptly sought U.S. permission to open a consulate in Sarasota with Dart as its consul. The request was rejected by the State Department, and the brothers eventually moved to the Cayman Islands. They have several business concerns on the islands, including Dart Enterprises which is a holding company involved in several projects, including the Camana Bay town development.

In 2001, the US Internal Revenue Service said the Dart brothers improperly billed $11.6 million of personal security costs to Dart Container. In U.S. Tax Court, Dart Container argued the money was a valid business expense due to "specific threats and other facts and circumstances". Half the money went for corporate aircraft. The IRS asked for $4 million more for 1996 and 1997 taxes. In 2003, the Internal Revenue Service took the brothers to court, saying they owed an additional $19 million in 1998 and 1999 taxes. In 2002, the Dart brothers and their companies paid $26 million in back taxes.

In May 2013, fifty agents of the Argentine tax authority raided the local Dart Container subsidiary Dart Sudamericana SRL on alleged tax evasion charges. The tax authority claimed that the firm imported polystrene beads at inflated prices, thus avoiding taxable gains through the unfair transfer pricing scheme.

References

External links 

Companies based in Ingham County, Michigan
American companies established in 1937
Manufacturing companies established in 1937
1937 establishments in Michigan
Privately held companies based in Michigan
Manufacturing companies based in Michigan
Packaging companies of the United States